Bonn Hauptbahnhof is a railway station located on the left bank of the Rhine along the Cologne–Mainz line. It  is the principal station serving the city of Bonn. In addition to extensive rail service from Deutsche Bahn it acts as a hub for local bus, tram, and Stadtbahn services.

History

The first station was constructed in 1844 by the Bonn-Cologne Railway Company, as part of the West Rhine Railway. The current building was erected between 1883 and 1884. From 1870 a train ferry connected Bonn station to the East Rhine Railway. With the opening of the Voreifel Railway to Euskirchen, the station became a rail junction.

In 1883 and 1884, a new station building was erected, which is now heritage listed.

The station sharply increased in importance in 1949, when Bonn became capital of the Federal Republic. Many politicians and federal employees travelled by train, as did guests of the state.

In 1969, Bonn grew considerably by incorporating towns which includes the stations of Bad Godesberg, Beuel, Duisdorf, Oberkassel and Mehlem and, in 1971, the station was renamed Bonn Hauptbahnhof.

Northwest of the station there used to be a small freight yard, which is now closed and partially demolished. The remaining tracks are used to allow freight trains to be overtaken and as a yard for assembling passenger trains and parking freight wagons. The Rhine Shore station (Rheinuferbahnhof) of the former Cologne-Bonn Railway (Köln-Bonner Eisenbahnen AG, KBE) was next to the station until 1985. As part of the construction of the Bonn Stadtbahn in the early 1970s, the existing buildings at the station were demolished and rebuilt. The design of the station forecourt was soon the subject of much controversy among the public of Bonn and there were several attempts to redesign it.

During the planning phase of the Cologne–Frankfurt high-speed line in the 1980s and early 1990s, a proposal to build a new line via Bonn station was controversial. This proposed a tunnel under the city, which would begin on the northern outskirts of Bonn and run through a deep level station 35 m below the main station. After crossing under the government district, the Rhine and the Siebengebirge hills to reach the line route that favoured by the Deutsche Bundesbahn to run via Limburg an der Lahn to Frankfurt. The additional cost of this option was estimated at about half a billion Euros. In addition, a route via Bonn-Beuel and Aegidienberg through  a 14 km long tunnel was also considered. Today, Bonn Hauptbahnhof is connected indirectly to the high-speed line, by tram line 66 of the Bonn Stadtbahn to Siegburg/Bonn station. Despite Intercity-Express services running through Siegburg/Bonn rather than Bonn, Bonn Hauptbahnhof is still a major stop for long-distance traffic.

Stadtbahn

Located beneath the main platforms are two underground platforms served by the Bonn Stadtbahn. Bonn Hauptbahnhof sits astride the north–south and east–west axes of the network and consequently sees daily about 50,000 passengers. The current facility opened in 1979.

Train services

The station is served by the following services:

Long-distance
Around 75 long-distance trains stop at Bonn Hauptbahnhof every day, including, since December 2021, the ICE Sprinter from Bonn to Berlin (only stopping at Cologne Hbf). The station is served by the following services.

Regional and S-Bahn services
Regional services  Rhein-Express Emmerich - Wesel - Oberhausen - Duisburg - Düsseldorf - Cologne - Bonn - Koblenz
Local services  MittelrheinBahn Cologne - Bonn - Remagen - Andernach - Koblenz - Bingen - Mainz 
Local services  Rhein-Ahr-Bahn Bonn - Remagen - Bad Neuenahr - Dernau - Ahrbrück
Local services  Rhein-Wupper-Bahn Bonn-Mehlem - Bonn - Cologne - Solingen - Wuppertal - Wuppertal-Oberbarmen
Rhein-Sieg S-Bahn services  Bonn - Meckenheim - Rheinbach (- Euskirchen)

Stadtbahn services

 : Köln-Niehl-Sebastianstraße - Köln Hauptbahnhof - Rheinuferbahn - Bonn Hauptbahnhof - Stammstrecke - Bad Godesberg
 : Thielenbruch – Köln Hauptbahnhof - Rheinuferbahn - Bonn Hauptbahnhof
 : Tannenbusch – Rheinuferbahn – Bonn Hauptbahnhof – Stammstrecke – Bad Godesberg
 : Siegburg – Siegburg/Bonn – Bonn Hauptbahnhof – Stammstrecke – Ramersdorf – Bad Honnef
 : Siegburg – Siegburg/Bonn – Bonn Hauptbahnhof – Stammstrecke – Bad Godesberg
 : Bornheim – Bonn Hauptbahnhof – Stammstrecke – Ramersdorf

Tram services
Two tram lines serve a surface-level stop in front of Bonn Hauptbahnhof:

 : Auerberg – Bonn Hauptbahnhof – Dottendorf
 : Oberkassel – Ramersdorf – Bonn Hauptbahnhof – Dottendorf

References

External links

Railway stations in Bonn
Cologne-Bonn Stadtbahn stations
Railway stations in Germany opened in 1885